Tyler Damascus Thornton (born April 5, 1992) is an American basketball coach and former professional player who is an assistant coach for the Howard Bison men's basketball team. He was one of the top rated high school point guards in the class of 2010. Thornton played college basketball for the Duke Blue Devils.

High school
Thornton attended Gonzaga College High School in Washington, D.C. where he averaged 14.7 points, 3.4 rebounds, 4.0 assists, and  2.1 steals per game as a senior while maintaining a  GPA over 3.3. He also lettered four times, twice named team MVP.  He holds the school-record for career wins.  Thornton was named MVP of the Gonzaga D.C. Classic and the Hoopball Classic.  Tyler made the all-tournament teams at the Iolani Classic and Alhambra Invitational. In his senior year he was named to two all-conference teams and the Gonzaga Coaches award in 2008.  Named D.C. Sports Fan Freshman of the Year and Gonzaga Mr. Assist award in his first season on varsity. He also played AAU basketball on the D.C. Assault with his Duke Blue Devil teammate Josh Hairston.

|}

College career
Thornton committed to Duke University on September 13, 2008, over Georgetown, North Carolina State, Texas, and Virginia. He was known by many fans to be a hardworking player.

Coaching career
Thornton joined the Howard Bison men's basketball team as an assistant coach in 2019.

References

External links
Duke Blue Devils bio
ESPN profile

1992 births
Living people
American expatriate basketball people in Canada
American expatriate basketball people in Finland
American men's basketball coaches
American men's basketball players
Basketball players from Maryland
Duke Blue Devils men's basketball players
Gonzaga College High School alumni
Halifax Hurricanes players
Helsinki Seagulls players
Howard Bison men's basketball coaches
People from Silver Spring, Maryland
Point guards